Johann Wilhelm Krause (1764-1842) was a German botanist. His botanical abbreviation is Krause.

Described species:
 Alsine nodosa (L.) Krause
 Asclepias dinteri Engl. & Krause, 1910
 Avena sativa var. praegravis Krause, 1837
 Salix pulchra Wimm. & Krause, 1866, nom. illeg
 Trollius paluster (L.) Krause

References

1764 births
1842 deaths
19th-century German botanists
18th-century agronomists
19th-century agronomists
18th-century German botanists